Good Ways is the reggae singer Sizzla's fifth studio album. It was produced by Bobby Digital and released by VP Records on December 21, 1998.

Track listing
Bless Me (Collins, Dixon, Smith) - 3:23
Good Ways (Collins, Dixon, Dodd) - 3:20
Azanldo (Collins, Dixon, Riley) - 3:10
Trust & Love (Collins, Dodd, Stewart) - 3:39
Bless the Youth (Collins, Dixon, Harriott) - 3:45
Anytime Now (Collins, Yebuah) - 3:22
Gun Handling Pros (Collins, Harris) - 3:39
Mockeries & Phrase (Collins, Dixon) - 4:28
Protect Us & Bless Us (Collins, Dixon) - 3:42
Can't Cool Can't Quench (Collins, Dunkley, Nugent, Tomlinson) - 4:12
Suffer If They Don't Hear (Brown, Collins, Stewart) - 3:34
Half That Has Never Been Told (Collins, Dixon, Dodd) - 3:42
Big & Bold (Collins, Dixon) - 3:28
Joyfull (Collins, Dixon) - 3:45

1998 albums
Sizzla albums